Tiliacea is a genus of moths of the family Noctuidae.

Species
 Tiliacea aculeata Hreblay & Ronkay, 1997
 Tiliacea auragides (Draudt, 1950)
 Tiliacea aurago  – Barred Sallow (Denis & Schiffermüller, 1775)
 Tiliacea citrago (Linnaeus, 1758)
 Tiliacea cypreago (Hampson, 1906)
 Tiliacea glaucozona Hreblay, Peregovits & Ronkay, 1999
 Tiliacea japonago (Wileman & West, 1929)
 Tiliacea melonina (Butler, 1889)
 Tiliacea sulphurago (Denis & Schiffermüller, 1775)
 Tiliacea tatachana Chang, 1991
 Tiliacea tigrina (Kononenko, 1978)
 Tiliacea yunnana Chen, 1999

References
Natural History Museum Lepidoptera genus database
Tiliacea at funet

Cuculliinae